Tetanolita palligera is a litter moth of the family Erebidae. It is found from British Columbia south to Oregon, Arizona and California.

External links
Images
Bug Guide

Herminiinae
Moths of North America
Moths described in 1884